Mitch is a short form of the masculine given name Mitchell. It is also sometimes a nickname, usually for a person with the surname Mitchell. It may refer to:

People

 Mitch Altman (born 1956), hacker and inventor
 Mitch Apau (born 1990), Dutch footballer
 Mitch Austin (born 1991), Australian footballer
Mitch Benn (born 1970), English comedian and satirist, known for his musical parodies
 Mitch Berger (born 1972), Canadian former National Football League punter
 Mitch Brown (disambiguation)
Mitch Clark (born 1987), Australian rules footballer
Mitch Clarke (born 1985), Canadian mixed martial artist
Mitch Cornish (born 1993), Australian rugby league player
 Mitch Creek (born 1992), Australian basketball player
 Mitch Daniels (born 1949), American academic administrator, businessman, author and retired politician, 49th Governor of Indiana
 Mitch English, American morning talk show host, comedian, actor, reporter and weatherman
 Mitch Epstein (born 1952), American art photographer
 Mitch Evans (born 1994), New Zealander racing driver
 Mitch Garver (born 1991), American baseball player
 Mitch Gaylord (born 1961), American Olympic champion gymnast
 Mitch Glasser (born 1989), American-Israeli baseball player
 Mitch Golby (born 1991), Australian rules footballer
 Mitch Grassi (born 1992), American musician, YouTube personality, and member of a capella band Pentatonix
 Mitch Haniger (born 1990), American baseball player
 Mitch Harris (born 1970), American guitarist and member of England-based grindcore band Napalm Death
 Mitch Hedberg (1968–2005), American stand-up comedian
 Mitch Hewer (born 1989), British actor
 Mitchell Hurwitz (born 1963), American television writer, producer and actor
 Mitch Hyatt (born 1997), American football player
 Mitch Kapor (born 1950), American entrepreneur
 Mitch Keller (born 1996), American baseball player
 Mitch Kupchak (born 1954), American National Basketball Association player and general manager
 Mitch Landrieu (born 1960), American politician and lawyer
 Mitch Lucker (1984–2012), American vocalist of extreme metal band Suicide Silence
 Mitch Marner (born 1997), Canadian ice hockey player for the Toronto Maple Leafs
 Mitch McConnell (born 1942), American politician and Senate Minority Leader
 Mitch Merrett, Canadian record producer
 Mitch Miller (1911–2010), American oboist, conductor, recording producer and recording industry executive
 Mitch Mitchell (1946–2008), English drummer with The Jimi Hendrix Experience
 Mitch Mustain (born 1988), American college football player
 Mitch Nilsson (born 1991), Australian professional baseball player
 Mitch Pileggi (born 1952), American actor best known for his role in The X-Files
 Mitch Potter (born 1980), American track and field athlete
 Mitch Richmond (born 1965), American basketball player
 Mitch Robinson (born 1989), Australian rules footballer
 Mitchell Trubisky (born 1994), American National Football League quarterback
 Mitch Ward (born 1971), English footballer
 Mitch White (baseball) (born 1994), American baseball player
 Mitch White (footballer, born 1996), Australian rules footballer
 Mitch Williams (born 1964), American retired Major League Baseball relief pitcher
 Mitch Williams (politician) (born 1953), Australian politician and farmer
 Mitch Wishnowsky (born 1992), American football player
 Mitch Young (born 1961), American football player

Stage or ring name
 Mitch Ryder, stage name of American musician William S. Levise, Jr. (born 1945)
 Mitch, ring name of wrestler Nick Mitchell

Fictional characters
 Mitch Buchannon, main character of the TV series Baywatch, played by David Hasselhoff
 "Mitch", the self-given nickname of Mitsuhiro Higa, The Ultimate Soccer Player, from Danganronpa Another: Another Despair Academy
 Mitch Laurence, in the soap opera One Life to Live
 Mitch Leery, a character in Dawson's Creek who is Dawson's father
 Mitch Mitchelson, a villain in The Powerpuff Girls
 Mitch Rapp, the main character in a series of novels by Vince Flynn
 Mitch Szalinski, in the movie Honey, We Shrunk Ourselves
 Mitch Williams (General Hospital), in the soap opera General Hospital
 "Mitch", nickname of Harold Mitchell, one of the principal characters in A Streetcar Named Desire
 Mitch, the main character in the movie City Slickers
 Mitch, a character in Whatever Happened to... Robot Jones?
 Mitch, in the movie Old School, played by Luke Wilson
 Mitch Blake, a character in the soap opera Another World
 Mitch "Muscle Man" Sorenstein, a fictional character in the Cartoon Network animated series Regular Show
Detective Mitch Kelloway, detective in the 1994 movie, Mask

Animals
 Mitch (Meerkat Manor), a meerkat in the television series Meerkat Manor

See also
 Colin Mitchell (1925–1996), British Army lieutenant colonel nicknamed "Mad Mitch"

English-language masculine given names
Hypocorisms
English masculine given names